In mathematics, a functional (as a noun) is a certain type of function. The exact definition of the term varies depending on the subfield (and sometimes even the author).
 In linear algebra, it is synonymous with linear forms, which are linear mapping from a vector space  into its field of scalars (that is, an element of the dual space )
 In functional analysis and related fields, it refers more generally to a mapping from a space  into the field of real or complex numbers. In functional analysis, the term  is a synonym of linear form; that is, it is a scalar-valued linear map. Depending on the author, such mappings may or may not be assumed to be linear, or to be defined on the whole space 
 In computer science, it is synonymous with higher-order functions, that is, functions that take functions as arguments or return them.

This article is mainly concerned with the second concept, which arose in the early 18th century as part of the calculus of variations. The first concept, which is more modern and abstract, is discussed in detail in a separate article, under the name linear form. The third concept is detailed in the computer science article on higher-order functions.

In the case where the space  is a space of functions, the functional is a "function of a function", and some older authors actually define the term "functional" to mean "function of a function".
However, the fact that  is a space of functions is not mathematically essential, so this older definition is no longer prevalent.

The term originates from the calculus of variations, where one searches for a function that minimizes (or maximizes) a given functional. A particularly important application in physics is search for a state of a system that minimizes (or maximizes) the action, or in other words the time integral of the Lagrangian.

Details

Duality
The mapping

is a function, where  is an argument of a function  
At the same time, the mapping of a function to the value of the function at a point

is a functional; here,  is a parameter.

Provided that  is a linear function from a vector space to the underlying scalar field, the above linear maps are dual to each other, and in functional analysis both are called linear functionals.

Definite integral
Integrals such as

form a special class of functionals. They map a function  into a real number, provided that  is real-valued. Examples include
 the area underneath the graph of a positive function  
  norm of a function on a set  
 the arclength of a curve in 2-dimensional Euclidean space

Inner product spaces

For example, taking the inner product with a fixed function  defines a (linear) functional on the Hilbert space  of square integrable functions on

Locality
If a functional's value can be computed for small segments of the input curve and then summed to find the total value, the functional is called local. Otherwise it is called non-local. For example:

is local while

is non-local. This occurs commonly when integrals occur separately in the numerator and denominator of an equation such as in calculations of center of mass.

Functional equations

The traditional usage also applies when one talks about a functional equation, meaning an equation between functionals: an equation  between functionals can be read as an 'equation to solve', with solutions being themselves functions. In such equations there may be several sets of variable unknowns, like when it is said that an additive map  is one satisfying Cauchy's functional equation:

Derivative and integration

Functional derivatives are used in Lagrangian mechanics. They are derivatives of functionals; that is, they carry information on how a functional changes when the input function changes by a small amount.

Richard Feynman used functional integrals as the central idea in his sum over the histories formulation of quantum mechanics. This usage implies an integral taken over some function space.

See also

References

 
  
 
  
 
  
  
 
 

Types of functions